Frank Orban (born 29 September 1964) is a Belgian former cyclist. He competed in the sprint event at the 1984 Summer Olympics.

References

External links
 

1964 births
Living people
Belgian male cyclists
Olympic cyclists of Belgium
Cyclists at the 1984 Summer Olympics
Cyclists from Antwerp